A list of Spanish-produced and co-produced feature films released in Spain in 2005. The theatrical release date is favoured.

Films

Box office 
The ten highest-grossing Spanish films in 2005, by domestic box office gross revenue, are as follows:

See also 
 20th Goya Awards
 2005 in film

Informational notes

References

External links
 Spanish films of 2005 at the Internet Movie Database

2005
Spanish
Films